The 1956–57 National Football League was the 26th staging of the National Football League (NFL), an annual Gaelic football tournament for the Gaelic Athletic Association county teams of Ireland.

Galway beat Kerry in the final, which was remembered as one of the greatest games for years. Kerry lead 0-5 to 0-4 at half-time. The "goal of the century", created by Seán Purcell and scored by Frank Stockwell, secured victory.

Format

Results

Finals

References

National Football League
National Football League
National Football League (Ireland) seasons